The Sahelian goat is a breed of goat from West Africa, used mainly for meat and skin production.

It is also known by some other names such as Cheèvre bariolée, Fulani, Gorane, Nioro, Niafounké, Sahélienne, Sahel, and West African Longlegged Goat (WALL-G).

Distribution
The Sahelian goat belongs to the Savanna group of goats with many types and subtypes raised in the Saharan and sub-Saharan region. Sahelian type of goat is distributed in north and northwest of Mali. The Sahelian goat is most suited to desert or semidesert environments and is intolerant of areas with high humidity. The breed is widely distributed in the arid and semiarid zones of the Sahel, north of 12°N from central Chad in the east to the Atlantic coast in the west and well into the southern Sahara. This is the most suitable place, where most of the world's Sahelian goats are found, although some numbers of this goat breed can also be found elsewhere in the world, especially in such areas where suitable environments or conditions are available, such as Australia. The Sahelian goat is not a trypano-tolerant goat breed, and they usually do not survive for long in forest and dense savanna. They are very strong animals which are found and survive well only in desert environments. They are especially well-adapted to a nomadic life and can fed on a variety of vegetation found within their native regions.

Characteristics
Sahelian goat is a small sized animal. They are thin in appearance with narrow body, shallow chest and sloping short croup. They have stiff short hair with variety of colors. Their color vary from pure white, cream to red, black or gray sprinkled or pied, gray, brown or black. They have long legs, and pendent or semipendulous ears. Both bucks and does have horns. Most of them (about 70%) have wattles. Udders in females and scrotums in males split into two halves. Average height of the adult Sahelian buck is about 70–85 cm, and 65–75 cm for does. The bucks on average weight about 38.5 to 56.7 kg, and average weight of the does is about 25 to 34 kg.<ref> </ref

Uses
The Sahelian goat is a multipurpose goat breed. It is a good meat goat breed, good for skin production, and also very rarely raised for milk.

Special considerations
Sahelian goats are very strong and hardy animals.  First kidding occurs usually about 18 months of age. Does can produce two kids per kidding, but most produce one kid (almost 70%), and their lactation period is usually 5–6 months.

References

Goat breeds
Meat goat breeds
Goatskin-producing goat breeds
Animal breeds originating in Mali